Vadim Vasilyev may refer to :

 Vadim Vasilyev (footballer), born 1972
 Vadim Vasilyev (businessman), born 1965